Chikurin-ji (竹林寺) is a Buddhist temple in Ikoma, Nara, Japan. The main object of worship (本尊) is Monju Bosatsu (Manjushri).

History

The temple is said to have been established by the monk Gyoki (行基) in the 8th century and is well known as the place where Gyoki is buried. A silver urn containing his burial record was found in 1255. It has since been designated a National Treasure of Japan.

Access
Chikurin-ji is close to Ichibu Station on the Kintetsu Ikoma Line.

References
 Chikurin-ji, Digital Museum of Ikoma City (In Official Home Page of Ikoma City)
Nihon Kotsu Kosha, Nara, Nihon Kotsu Kosha, 1984, p. 138.
Japanese version of Wikipedia

External links
 

Buddhist temples in Nara Prefecture
Gyōki